Thomas Ridge may refer to:

 Tom Ridge (born 1945), American politician and author
 Thomas Ridge (cricketer) (1737–1801), English cricketer
 Thomas L. Ridge (1915–1999), United States Marine Corps officer
 Thomas Ridge (MP) (1670s–1730), British brewer, merchant and politician